Bancroft is an unincorporated area in Louisiana. It is in Beauregard Parish near the border with Texas.

The North Bancroft Field is a geological area dating to the Eocene era that was drilled for oil. Bancroft was a lumber settlement that had 250 men at it. It had a post office. Bancroft Colored School served grades 1 to 8. The school serving the area became 68 percent African American after integration. Spikes Cemetery is in Bancroft.

In 2021 the old school building in Bancroft was still standing.

References

Unincorporated communities in Beauregard Parish, Louisiana